Sennhof-Kyburg railway station is a railway station in the Swiss canton of Zurich and city of Winterthur. It takes its name from that city's quarter of Sennhof, in which it is located, together with the adjoining municipality of Kyburg. The station is located on the Tösstal line. It is an intermediate stop on Zurich S-Bahn services S11 and S26.

References 

Railway stations in the canton of Zürich
Swiss Federal Railways stations
Illnau-Effretikon